José Sigifredo Treviño Ruiz (born January 29, 1960) is a Mexican former professional footballer and manager.

He most recently managed Real C.D. España in the Honduran Liga Nacional.

Career
Treviño played football for C.F. Monterrey and Correcaminos UAT in the Primera División de México.

References

External links

Profile at MedioTiempo

1960 births
Living people
Footballers from Nuevo León
C.F. Monterrey players
Correcaminos UAT footballers
Mexican football managers
C.F. Monterrey managers
F.C. Motagua managers
Real C.D. España managers
Association footballers not categorized by position
Mexican footballers